Cruz Records was an offshoot record label of SST Records, owned by the Black Flag guitarist Greg Ginn.  The label was founded in 1987.  Its roster consisted mainly of pop punk and grunge bands, along with Ginn's solo records.  The label has remained inactive since the mid-1990s although the pieces of its back catalog that are still in print are still available through SST Records.

Artists
 ALL
 Chemical People
 Greg Ginn
 Jack Endino
 Skin Yard
 Big Drill Car
 TonyALL
 Goodbye Harry
 Endino's Earthworm
 Rig
 Dirt Fishermen

See also
 List of record labels

External links
 SST and Cruz Records
 Cruz Records at Discogs

Defunct record labels of the United States
Punk record labels